Berlin is an unincorporated community in Bourbon County, Kansas, United States.

History
A post office was opened in Berlin in 1879, and remained in operation until it was discontinued in 1903. The community has most likely been named in the honor of Berlin, Georgia.

References

Further reading

External links
 Bourbon County maps: Current, Historic - KDOT

Unincorporated communities in Bourbon County, Kansas
Unincorporated communities in Kansas